Mad TV is an American sketch comedy series that aired from October 14, 1995 to May 16, 2009, then from July 26, 2016 to September 27, 2016. It was nominated for and won a variety of awards during its time on air. It won five Primetime Emmy Awards out of 43 nominations, all of which were for technical work. The show also won five Make-Up Artists and Hair Stylists Guild Awards and three ADG Excellence in Production Design Awards.

Awards and nominations

References

Mad TV